The Omni Grove Park is a historical resort hotel on the western-facing slope of Sunset Mountain within the Blue Ridge Mountains, in Asheville, North Carolina. This hotel has also had the privilege of being visited by various Presidents of the United States mentioned below.
Listed on the National Register of Historic Places, the hotel is an example of the Arts and Crafts style. It also features a £38 Million (US$44 million), modern subterranean spa. The Grove Park Inn is a member of the Historic Hotel of America, the program of the National Trust for Historic Preservation. The Grove Park Inn also owns an 18-hole golf course situated on the hill below the hotel. Donald Ross (who designed Pinehurst Resort) designed the original course.

History

The hotel was outfitted with furnishings from the Roycrofters of East Aurora, New York, and built of rough granite stones. The lobby has large, granite fireplaces and a porch with a scenic overlook.  It was advertised as having "walls five feet thick of granite boulders".

During World War II, the inn was used first as an internment center for Axis diplomats. The diplomats and their staff were allowed guarded trips to town, where they would purchase goods from the local merchants. This was a boon to the strapped local economy. The Inn was then used by the Navy as a rest and rehabilitation center for returning sailors.  From 1944 to 1945, the hotel was an Army Redistribution Station where soldiers rested and relaxed before being assigned to other duties. The Philippine government functioned in exile from the Presidential Cottage (a replica of Anne Hathaway's Cottage) on the grounds during the war.

The Grove Park Inn became part of Sammons Enterprises in 1955. The resort has been expanded over the years in 1958, 1963 and 2001. Under the direction of the owners Mr. and Mrs. Sammons it continues to be a popular tourist attraction. Mrs. Sammons would occasionally sneak her dog in undercover in a baby carriage. Mrs. Sammons died in 2008. KSL Resorts acquired the Grove Park Inn in 2012 for £100 Million (US$120 million). They again resold it to Omni Hotels in 2013, and it was renamed the Omni Grove Park Inn.

According to a 2013 article in the Wall Street Journal, the U.S. Supreme Court planned to relocate to the Grove Park Inn in the event of a nuclear attack.

Grove Park and Biltmore relationship

In 1917, just four years after the completion of the construction of the Grove Park Inn,  Fred Seely purchased Biltmore Estate Industries from Edith Vanderbilt, wife of George Washington Vanderbilt II, the owner of the Biltmore Estate in Asheville, North Carolina.  This new venture came in addition to his responsibilities as the manager of the Grove Park Inn. E.W. Grove, his father-in-law and owner of the Grove Park Inn, had refused to sell the hotel to Seely, though he had eagerly allowed him to construct the building.  He instead leased the hotel to Seely to manage and Seely did so until 1927, the year of Grove's death and the year Seely lost his legal bid to own the hotel. Grove left his hotel to his wife, son and daughter. Though Seely was married to his daughter, Grove made no concessions to Seely, and the Inn passed into the hands of what one advertisement described as "more liberal management." An interesting annotation by Seely scribbled next to the advertisement found in his files takes issue with that characterization.

Presidential visits
 William Howard Taft – 27th President of the United States, stayed in 1929 and 1930
 Woodrow Wilson – 28th President of the United States 
 Calvin Coolidge – 30th President of the United States
 Herbert Hoover – 31st President of the United States 
 Franklin D. Roosevelt – 32nd President of the United States, stayed in 1936
 Dwight D. Eisenhower – 34th President of the United States, stayed in 1947
 Richard M. Nixon – 37th President of the United States in 1956
 George H. W. Bush – 41st President of the United States in 1986
 William J. Clinton – 42nd President of the United States in 1987
 Barack H. Obama – 44th President of the United States, stayed in 2008 and 2010

In literature

In Lee Smith's Guests on Earth: A Novel (which is about Zelda Fitzgerald and published in 2013), the central character often makes references to the Omni Grove Inn as the novel takes place in Asheville, North Carolina.

In Cormac McCarthy's 1979 novel Suttree (set in Knoxville), the title character and his girlfriend spend four days at the inn, staying in what McCarthy described as "a cool room high in the old rough pile of rocks."

Even as We Breathe by Annette Saunooke Clapsaddle

See also
 List of Historic Hotels of America

References

Sources
The Grove Park Inn Story, 1984
Johnson, Bruce E.  Built for the Ages: A History of the Grove Park Inn, Grove Park Inn and Country Club: Asheville, NC, 1991

External links

Historic Postcard Images of the Grove Park Inn
Photos from the 2001 Grove Park Inn Arts & Crafts Conference
Visitor Information for the Grove Park Inn Resort
Asheville, North Carolina, a National Park Service Discover Our Shared Heritage Travel Itinerary

American Craftsman architecture in North Carolina
Buildings and structures in Asheville, North Carolina
Golf clubs and courses in North Carolina
Golf clubs and courses designed by Donald Ross
Hotels in Asheville, North Carolina
Hotel buildings on the National Register of Historic Places in North Carolina
Resorts in North Carolina
Hotel buildings completed in 1913
Hotels established in 1913
Tourist attractions in Asheville, North Carolina
National Register of Historic Places in Buncombe County, North Carolina
1913 establishments in North Carolina
Historic Hotels of America